The 2016–17 USC Trojans men's basketball team represented the University of Southern California during the 2016–17 NCAA Division I men's basketball season. They were led by fourth-year head coach Andy Enfield. They played their home games at the Galen Center in Los Angeles as members of the Pac-12 Conference. They finished the season 26–10, 10–8 in Pac-12 play to finish in a tie for fifth place; their 26 victories set a program record. They defeated Washington in the first round of the Pac-12 tournament before losing in the quarterfinals to UCLA. They received an at-large bid to the NCAA tournament where they defeated Providence in the First Four and SMU in the First Round before losing in the Second Round to Baylor.

Previous season
The Trojans finished the 2015–16 season 21–13, 9–9 in Pac-12 play to finish in three-way tie for sixth place. The Trojans beat UCLA in the first round before losing to Utah in the quarterfinals of the Pac-12 tournament. They received an at-large bid as a No. 8 seed in the East Region of the NCAA tournament, marking the Trojans' first Tournament bid since 2011. USC lost to No. 9-seed Providence in the First Round.

Off-season

Departures

Incoming transfers

2016 recruiting class

Roster

Dec. 1, 2016 – Sophomore Bennie Boatwright out with a left knee injury. Expected to miss six weeks. Made return against Washington on Feb. 1 after missing 15 games.

Schedule and results

|-
!colspan=12 style=| Non-conference regular season

|-
!colspan=12 style=| Pac-12 regular season

|-
!colspan=12 style=| Pac-12 Tournament

|-
!colspan=12 style=| NCAA tournament

Ranking movement

References

USC Trojans men's basketball seasons
Usc
Usc
USC Trojans
USC Trojans